Perfect Day or A Perfect Day may refer to:

Film and television
 Perfect Day (1929 film), a comedy short starring Laurel and Hardy
 Perfect Day (2005 film), a British television film
 A Perfect Day (2005 film), a Lebanese film
 A Perfect Day (2006 film), a television Christmas film starring Rob Lowe
 A Perfect Day (2008 film), an Italian film
 A Perfect Day (2015 film), a Spanish film
 Perfect Day (Sapphire & Steel), an audio drama based on the television series Sapphire & Steel
 Perfect Day, the sequel series to New Scandinavian Cooking

Episodes
 "Perfect Day" (2point4 children)
 "Perfect Day" (Ben 10)
 "A Perfect Day" (Cold Case)

Companies
 Perfect Day (company), a startup creating milk proteins using microflora

Music

Albums
Perfect Day (Cascada album), 2007
Perfect Day (Chris Whitley album), 2000
Perfect Day (Lou Reed album), 1997
A Perfect Day (album), by Stefanie Sun, 2005
A Perfect Day (EP), a split EP by Lee Ranaldo and Something to Burn, 1992

Songs
"Perfect Day" (Cascada song), 2008
"Perfect Day" (EMF song), 1995
"Perfect Day" (Jim Jones song), 2011
"Perfect Day" (Lou Reed song), 1972; covered by many artists
"A Perfect Day" (song), written by Carrie Jacobs-Bond, published 1910; recorded by many artists
"Perfect Day", by Collective Soul from Blender, 2000
"Perfect Day", by Hoku, 2001
"Perfect Day", by Kelis from Wanderland, 2001
"Perfect Day", by Lady A from Need You Now, 2010 
"Perfect Day", by Harry Nilsson from Knnillssonn, 1977 
"Perfect Day", by Miriam Stockley featured in The World of Peter Rabbit and Friends
"Perfect Day", by Roxette from Joyride, 1991
"Perfect Day", by Skin
"Perfect Day", by the Suicide Machines from The Suicide Machines, 2000
"The Perfect Day", by Fischer-Z from Reveal

See also
One Perfect Day (disambiguation)
This Perfect Day, a novel by Ira Levin
"This Perfect Day" (song), by the Saints